Generation A may refer to:

 Generation Alpha, a demographic cohort born between the early 2010s and the 2020s
 Generation A (book), a 2009 book by Douglas Coupland
 "Generation A", a song by Arcade Fire